Ready or Not is a 2019 American black comedy horror film directed by Matt Bettinelli-Olpin and Tyler Gillett and written by Guy Busick and R. Christopher Murphy. It stars Samara Weaving, Adam Brody, Mark O'Brien, Henry Czerny, and Andie MacDowell. It follows Grace (Weaving), a newlywed who is hunted by her spouse's wealthy Satan-worshipping family as part of a wedding night ritual.

Preparations began in November 2017 when Bettinelli-Olpin and Gillett, members of the Radio Silence filmmaking collective, were hired as directors. After setting an initial release date, casting occurred from August to October 2018. Principal photography began later that month and concluded in November, in locations in and around Toronto, Canada and the surrounding Ontario area.

It premiered at the Fantasia International Film Festival on July 27, 2019, and was theatrically released in the United States on August 21, 2019, by Fox Searchlight Pictures. It received positive reviews from critics, who praised the performances of the cast, Olpin and Gillett's direction, and screenplay. It grossed over $57.6 million worldwide on a $6 million budget.

Plot 
As a child, Daniel le Domas is confronted in his family's mansion by a wounded man named Charles, who begs him for help. Instead, Daniel alerts his family, who arrive in ceremonial masks and robes. Despite his bride's pleas, Charles is shot with a speargun and dragged away into a locked room.

30 years later, Daniel's brother Alex, the estranged son of the owners of the successful Le Domas Family Games company, is set to marry Grace, a former foster child. On her wedding day, she meets the le Domases: Daniel and his snobbish wife Charity; Alex's cocaine-addicted sister Emilie, her oafish husband Fitch, and their young sons Georgie and Gabe; Alex's unpleasant Aunt Helene, and his parents Tony and Becky. After the ceremony, Tony explains that his ancestor Victor le Domas made a deal with a man named "le Bail" to build the Le Domas fortune in exchange for the family observing a tradition: at midnight on their wedding day, every new member draws a game card from Le Bail's puzzle box. Grace draws "Hide-and-Seek". Believing it to be a harmless game Grace goes to hide herself as the Le Domases each receive a weapon. Alex manages to find Grace, who witnesses Emilie accidentally kill a maid whom she mistakes for Grace.

Alex reveals that his family is cursed: if the new member draws the Hide-and-Seek card, the rest of the family has to find and ritually sacrifice them before dawn or they die instead. The deadly game was last played by Helene's husband, Charles. With the mansion locked down, Alex disables the security system to allow Grace to escape. She is discovered by Daniel, who is disillusioned with his family and gives her a head start before alerting the others, in the chaos Emilie accidentally kills another maid. Grace's escape is blocked by the family butler, Stevens. She, in turn, splatters the hot tea he was preparing on his face and runs away. Alex is restrained by Daniel and Tony after he attacks the latter. Grace is seen by a third maid, but the maid accidentally crushes herself in a dumbwaiter when she yells for the family.

Grace runs to the stables where Georgie shoots her in the hand. She knocks him out and then but is startled by a goat and falls into a pit filled with the corpses of the le Domases' previous sacrifices. She escapes and makes it through the front gate. Grace is pursued into the forest by Stevens, even though she fights him off she is eventually captured by him. As he is driving Grace back to the house she awakens and attacks him, causing the car to crash and kill him. Daniel, nearby the crash, captures Grace after realizing that his father is secretly watching.

The le Domases prepare to complete the ritual sacrafice, however they are incapacitated after Daniel poisoned them with a non-lethal dose of hydrochloric acid in the ritual cup. Charity shoots Daniel in the neck after he attempts to protect Grace, leaving him to bleed to death as Grace runs away. In the ongoing chaos, the mansion is set on fire, and Grace is attacked by Becky, whom she beats to death with Le Bail's box.

Alex escapes his restraints and goes to find Grace, but she pulls away from him. Realizing that she will never trust him and will almost certainly leave him once she escapes, he subdues her to complete the ritual. Grace breaks free from the ritual table, just as the sun rises. The le Domases brace for death, but nothing happens. Despite Grace having won the game Helene attempts to attack her but suddenly explodes midstride, with the rest of the family exploding soon after, including Alex after he fails to convince Grace to forgive him. Le Bail briefly appears and gives Grace a slight head nod, and she walks out of the burning manor just as the police arrives.

Cast 
 Samara Weaving as Grace le Domas, Alex's naive and unassuming young bride and wife
 Adam Brody as Daniel le Domas, Emilie and Alex’s alcoholic brother
 Etienne Kellici as young Daniel le Domas
 Mark O'Brien as Alex le Domas, Grace's conflicted husband, Daniel and Emilie's brother
 Chase Churchill as young Alex le Domas
 Henry Czerny as Tony le Domas, owner of the Le Domas Gaming Dominion and patriarch of the le Domas family
 Andie MacDowell as Becky le Domas, Daniel, Emilie and Alex’s family-oriented mother
 Kate Ziegler as young Becky le Domas
 Melanie Scrofano as Emilie le Domas, Daniel and Alex's cocaine-addicted sister
 Kristian Bruun as Fitch Bradley, Emilie's clueless husband, Georgie and Gabe’s father
 Elyse Levesque as Charity le Domas, Daniel's snobbish wife, who presumably has a lower-class background similar to Grace
 Nicky Guadagni as Helene le Domas, Daniel, Emilie and Alex’s eerie aunt
 Elana Dunkelman as young Helene le Domas
 John Ralston as Stevens, the le Domas’ loyal family butler
 Liam McDonald as Georgie Bradley, Fitch's and Emilie's son
 Ethan Tavares as Gabe Bradley, Fitch's and Emilie's son
 Hanneke Talbot as Clara, a maid who is the “favourite”, shot in the face by Emilie
 Celine Tsai as Tina, a maid who was accidentally shot by Emilie with a crossbow
 Daniela Barbosa as Dora, a maid who was hired because Tony liked the way she danced, crushed by the dumbwaiter
 Andrew Anthony as Charles, Helene's late husband, briefly Daniel, Emilie and Alex’s uncle
 Nat Faxon as the voice of Justin, employee of the car onboard assistance company
 Guy Busick and R. Christopher Murphy, the film's writers, as the "How To Use A Crossbow" instructors (uncredited)
 James Vanderbilt, the film's producer, as Le Bail (uncredited), an anagram for the name Belial, a word used in the Hebrew bible to characterize wicked or worthless, which has become personified as devil.

Production 
In November 2017 it was announced that Matt Bettinelli-Olpin and Tyler Gillett would direct the film, from a screenplay by Guy Busick and R. Christopher Murphy. Ready or Not was produced by Tripp Vinson, James Vanderbilt, William Sherak, and Bradley J. Fischer. Tara Farney, Tracey Nyberg and Chad Villella executive-produced, under their Mythology Entertainment and Vinson Films production banners, respectively.
From August to October 2018, Samara Weaving, Andie MacDowell, Adam Brody, Mark O'Brien, Melanie Scrofano, Henry Czerny and Elyse Levesque were cast.

Principal photography was from October 15, 2018 to November 19, 2018 at locations in the Toronto area, including Casa Loma, Sunnybrook Park, the Claireville Conservation Area, and the Parkwood Estate in Oshawa, Ontario.

Release 

The film had its world premiere at the Fantasia International Film Festival on July 27, 2019, and was theatrically released in the United States on August 21, 2019. Ready or Not was released on Digital HD on November 26, 2019, and on DVD and Blu-ray on December 3. The release includes a 42-minute making-of documentary, an audio commentary with star Samara Weaving, directors Matt Bettinelli-Olpin and Tyler Gillett, and executive producer Chad Villella, as well as a photo gallery and a gag reel.

Reception

Box office 
Ready or Not grossed $28.7 million in the United States and Canada, and $28.9 million in other territories, for a worldwide total of $57.6 million, against a production budget of $6 million.

In the United States and Canada, the film was projected to gross around $6.5 million in its opening weekend and $8–12 million over its five-day opening frame. Playing at 2,818 theaters, it was the widest release in Fox Searchlight's history. It made $1.9 million on its first day, Wednesday, including $730,000 from Tuesday night previews, and $1.1 million on its second. The film went on to debut to $8 million during its opening weekend (and $11 million over its first five days), finishing second on its first two days and sixth for the weekend. It fell just 26% in its second weekend to $5.9 million, finishing fifth.

Critical response 
The site's critical consensus reads: "Smart, subversive, and darkly funny, Ready or Not is a crowd-pleasing horror film with giddily entertaining bite." On Metacritic the film has a weighted average score of 64 out of 100, based on reviews from 38 critics, indicating "generally favorable reviews." Audiences polled by CinemaScore gave the film an average grade of "B+" on an A+ to F scale, while those at PostTrak gave it an overall positive score of 71% (including an average 3.5 out of 5 stars) and a 50% "definite recommend."

Peter Debruge wrote in Variety that "This deliciously diabolical sophomore feature, which hails from the resourceful low-budget trio known as Radio Silence, represents a departure for indie distributor Fox Searchlight, which has a real winner on its hands — that rare Get Out-like horror movie capable of delivering superficial diversion alongside deep cultural critique." Peter Travers of Rolling Stone called the film "a decadent blast to watch a comic takedown of the rich done with the rude energy of a horror thriller and the courage of its own manic anti-marriage convictions."

Writing for IndieWire, David Ehrlich describes the film as "wickedly entertaining from start to finish, and painted with enough fresh personality to resolve into something more than the sum of its parts." Leah Greenblatt wrote in Entertainment Weekly, "Come for the crossbows, etc., and to watch Weaving's star be born in real time; stay for the socio-economic lessons and sweet, sweet revenge." David Sims of The Atlantic wrote, "The real fun in Ready or Not comes from the ways it subverts its time-tested story, balancing wry commentary and straightforward horror in its portrait of fumbling arrogance and curdled privilege." Bobby LePire rated the film 10/10 and wrote in Film Threat that "The acting is incredible, the directing striking and intense, and the screenplay is unbelievably brilliant and funny. I adore every scary and funny second of this movie and highly recommend it to everyone else."

Accolades

References

External links 
 
 

2019 films
2019 comedy horror films
Films directed by Matt Bettinelli-Olpin & Tyler Gillett
American comedy horror films
American supernatural horror films
Battle royale
Films about cults
Films about death games
Films about dysfunctional families
The Devil in film
Films about Satanism
Films about the upper class
Films about weddings
Films produced by James Vanderbilt
Films set in country houses
Films shot in Toronto
Films scored by Brian Tyler
Films with screenplays by Guy Busick
Films about siblings
2010s English-language films
2010s American films
Films about murder